Mashghaleh Zar (also Romanized as Mashghaleh Zār) is a village in Sakhvid Rural District, Nir District, Taft County, Yazd Province, Iran. At the 2006 census, its population was 14, in 6 families.

References 

Populated places in Taft County